Schwarzer See is a lake at Borkow in Ludwigslust-Parchim, Mecklenburg-Vorpommern, Germany. Its surface area is 0.48 km².

Lakes of Mecklenburg-Western Pomerania